Stephen Columbus Millard (January 14, 1841 – June 21, 1914) was a U.S. Representative from New York.

Born in Stamford, Vermont, Millard attended Powers Institute and graduated from Williams College in 1865. He attended Harvard Law School. He was admitted to the bar of the State of New York in May 1867 and commenced practice in Binghamton. He served as chairman of the Republican county committee 1872–1879.

Millard was elected as a Republican to the Forty-eighth and Forty-ninth Congresses (March 4, 1883 – March 3, 1887). He was not a candidate for renomination in 1886. He resumed the practice of law in Binghamton, New York, where he died June 21, 1914, being interred in Spring Forest Cemetery.

Sources

1841 births
1914 deaths
Williams College alumni
Harvard Law School alumni
Republican Party members of the United States House of Representatives from New York (state)
19th-century American politicians